Sarah McBride (born August 9, 1990) is an American activist and politician who is a Democratic member of the Delaware Senate since January 2021. She was previously the National Press Secretary of the Human Rights Campaign. After winning the September 15, 2020 Democratic primary in the safely-Democratic 1st Delaware State Senate district, she won in the November 2020 election. She is the first openly transgender state senator in the country, making her the highest-ranking transgender elected official in United States history.

McBride is largely credited with the passage of legislation in Delaware banning discrimination on the basis of gender identity in employment, housing, insurance, and public accommodations. In July 2016, she was a speaker at the Democratic National Convention, becoming the first openly transgender person to address a major party convention in American history.

In 2018, McBride released the book Tomorrow Will Be Different: Love, Loss, and the Fight for Trans Equality.

Early life 
Sarah McBride was born in Wilmington, Delaware, to David and Sally McBride on August 9, 1990. Her father was a lawyer for Young Conaway Stargatt & Taylor and her mother was a guidance counselor and a founder of the Cab Calloway School of the Arts. She graduated from Cab Calloway in 2009 and earned a bachelor's degree from the American University in 2013.

Early career 
Prior to coming out, McBride was a campaign staffer in Delaware, working on several campaigns including Delaware Attorney General Beau Biden's 2010 campaign and Governor Jack Markell's 2008 campaign. In 2011, McBride was elected student body president at American University. During her last week as student body president, McBride gained international attention when she came out as a transgender woman in her college's student newspaper, The Eagle.

McBride's coming out was featured on NPR, The Huffington Post, and by Lady Gaga's Born This Way Foundation. After coming out, McBride received a call from Delaware Attorney General Beau Biden, saying, "Sarah, I just wanted you to know, I'm so proud of you. I love you, and you're still a part of the Biden family."  Vice President Joe Biden expressed similar sentiments, sharing that he was proud of her and happy for her. In 2012, McBride interned at the White House, becoming the first openly transgender woman to work there in any capacity. McBride worked in the White House Office of Public Engagement and Intergovernmental Affairs, where she worked on LGBT issues. In a speech in May 2015, Second Lady Jill Biden told Sarah's story. She added, "we believe young people should be valued for who they are, no matter what they look like, where they're from, the gender with which they identify, or who they love."
In January 2013, McBride joined the board of directors of Equality Delaware and quickly became the state's leading advocate for legal protections and hate crimes legislation for transgender Delawareans. McBride and her family led the lobbying effort for legislation protecting Delawareans from discrimination on the basis of gender identity and expression in employment, housing, insurance, and public accommodations. In addition to serving as the primary spokesperson for the legislation, McBride's close relationship with Governor Jack Markell and Attorney General Beau Biden was credited with getting both elected officials vocally behind the bill. The legislation passed the state senate by a margin of one vote and the state house by a vote of 24–17. The amended bill was then re-passed by the state senate and immediately signed into law by Markell in June 2013.

Upon signing the legislation, Markell stated:I especially want to thank my friend Sarah McBride, an intelligent and talented Delawarean who happens to be transgender. She courageously stood before the General Assembly to describe her personal struggles with gender identity and communicate her desire to return home after her college graduation without fear. Her tireless advocacy for passage of this legislation has made a real difference for all transgender people in Delaware.After the passage of Delaware's gender identity protections and hate crimes legislation, McBride worked on the LGBT Progress team at the Center for American Progress. McBride has spoken at a number of colleges and LGBT events, including the Human Rights Campaign National Dinner, the Human Rights Campaign Los Angeles Dinner, the Victory Fund National Brunch, the University of Pennsylvania, and Gettysburg College. McBride was ranked the Most Valuable Progressive in Delaware by DelawareLiberal.net listed in the 2014 list of the Trans 100, and named one of the fifty upcoming millennials poised to make a difference in the coming years by MIC.com. A 2015 article in the New Statesman on transgender representation in elective office predicted McBride would be the first transgender American elected to high public office. McBride was a panelist at the U.S. Department of Housing and Urban Development's "GLOBE Pride 2016" on youth and workplace bullying. McBride has been featured in The New York Times, The Huffington Post, The Washington Post, The Boston Globe, Al Jazeera, PBS NewsHour, Teen Vogue, North Carolina Public Radio, The New Yorker, MSNBC, ThinkProgress, BuzzFeed, and NPR.

In April 2016, McBride delivered a TED Talk titled, "Gender assigned to us at birth should not dictate who we are." She also served on the steering committee of Trans United for Hillary, an effort to educate and mobilize transgender people and their allies in support of Hillary Clinton.

On July 28, 2016, McBride became the first openly transgender person to speak at a national party convention when she spoke at the 2016 Democratic National Convention. In her speech, which lasted less than four minutes, McBride paid tribute to her late husband Andrew Cray and his commitment to LGBT rights.

Political career
On July 9, 2019, McBride formally announced her candidacy for the Delaware Senate. Sarah stated that her focus will be health care and paid family and medical leave.

McBride was sworn in as a member of the Delaware Senate in January 2021. She is the first transgender state senator in United States history. She replaced fellow Democrat Harris McDowell III, who retired at the end of his term.

McBride is the Chair of the Delaware General Assembly Health & Social Services committee. She is also a member of the Corrections & Public Safety, Housing, Judiciary, and Veterans Affairs committees.

Tenure 
McBride sponsored Senate Bill 1, the Healthy Delaware Families Act, a bill to allow families to take a paid 12-week family or medical leave. If passed, workers will be eligible to receive up to 80% of their current wages or a maximum of $900 per week. The paid family and medical leave program would be paid for through automatic payroll contributions of less than 1%. The weekly payroll deduction would be split between an employer and the employee. Businesses with less than 20 employees would not have to pay the employer share; however, their workers would still benefit from the program if and when they need it. The bill has a fiscal note attached to it of over $21,000,000 for the first year; mostly for start-up costs.  Annual costs are estimated to be over $7,000,000. Senate Bill 1 was passed by the General Assembly on April 14, 2022.

Personal life
In August 2014, McBride married Andrew Cray after he received a terminal cancer diagnosis. Episcopal Bishop Gene Robinson presided at their ceremony. Four days after their wedding, Cray died from cancer.

Electoral history

References

Further reading

External links

1990 births
Living people
21st-century American women politicians
Activists from Delaware
Activists from Washington, D.C.
American University alumni
LGBT state legislators in Delaware
Transgender memoirists
American LGBT rights activists
Obama administration personnel
People from Wilmington, Delaware
Transgender politicians
Transgender women
Transgender rights activists
Women in Delaware politics
Democratic Party Delaware state senators
21st-century American politicians
21st-century American women writers
American women memoirists
Writers from Delaware